Alexandra of Greece and Denmark may refer to:

 Princess Alexandra of Greece and Denmark (1870–1891)
 Queen Alexandra of Yugoslavia, formerly Princess Alexandra of Greece and Denmark (1921–1993)
 Princess Alexandra of Greece (born 1968), first daughter of Prince Michael of Greece and Denmark and his wife (née Marina Karella)

See also
Princess Alexandra of Denmark (disambiguation)
Princess Alexandra (disambiguation)